Daryl Shane is a Canadian curler from Waterloo, Ontario. He is a former provincial junior champion. He presently skips a men's team on the Ontario Curling Tour, and has played on the World Curling Tour in past seasons.

Shane attended John Diefenbaker Secondary School in Hanover, Ontario where he skipped his rink of Terry McCannell, Brad Lantz and Gary Deeves to the 1978 provincial junior men's (schoolboy) curling championship.

Shane has played in four provincial men's championships, the most recent two being in 2008 and in 2012.

References

External links
 

Living people
Curlers from Ontario
Sportspeople from Waterloo, Ontario
Canadian male curlers
Year of birth missing (living people)